Euminucia is a genus of moths of the family Noctuidae.

Species
Euminucia camerunica Strand, 1913
Euminucia conflua Hampson, 1913
Euminucia ligulifera Strand, 1913
Euminucia orthogona Hampson, 1913

References
Natural History Museum Lepidoptera genus database

Catocalinae